The Haßlach  (alternative spelling: Hasslach) is a river in the Upper Franconian region of Landkreis Kronach in Bavaria, Germany. It flows into the Rodach River in the town of Kronach.

See also
List of rivers of Bavaria

References

External links 
 Course of the  Haßlach in the Atlas of Bavaria

Rivers of Bavaria
Rivers of Germany